The 2007–08 Alberta Pandas women's ice hockey was the eleventh Canadian Interuniversity Sport (CIS; renamed U Sports in 2016) season completed by the program. The Pandas finished the season ranked first in the Canada West conference with 21 wins, compared to 2 losses and one overtime loss. The Pandas appeared at the 2008 CIS National Championship Tournament and ended with a fourth-place finish.

Roster

Coaching staff
Howie Draper, head coach
Danielle Bourgeois, assistant coach
Judy Diduck, assistant coach
Dave Marcinyshyn, assistant coach
Dave Crowder, goalie coach
Stacey Phillips, goalie coach

Schedule

Postseason
Canada West Semifinals

Canada West Finals

Player stats

Awards and honors
Leah Copeland, Canada West leader, Assists
Jennifer Newton, Canada West Player of the Year
Jennifer Newton, Canada West scoring champion
Jennifer Newton, Canada West leader, Goals scored

Canada West All-Star team
 Jennifer Newton, First Team All-Star
 Alana Cabana, First Team All-Star
 Leah Copeland, Second Team All-Star
 Rayanne Reeve, Second Team All-Star
 Andrea Boras, All-Rookie team

See also
2009–10 Alberta Pandas women's ice hockey season

References

Alberta Pandas women's ice hockey
2007–08 Canadian Interuniversity Sport women's ice hockey season
Alb